Xypete, also Xypeteum or Xypeteon (Ξυπετεών), was said to have been likewise called Troja (Τροία), because Teucrus led from hence an Attic colony into Phrygia, was a deme of ancient Attica. It was apparently near Peiraeeus or Phalerum, since Xypete, Peiraeeus, Phalerum, and Thymoetadae formed the τετράκωμοι, which had a temple of Heracles in common (τετράκωμον Ἡρακλεῖον). 

The site of Xypete is tentatively located northeast of Peiraieus.

References

Populated places in ancient Attica
Former populated places in Greece
Demoi